Wirral Metropolitan Borough Council elections are generally held three years out of every four, with a third of the council being elected each time. Wirral Metropolitan Borough Council, generally known as Wirral Council, is the local authority for the metropolitan borough of Wirral in Merseyside, England. Since the last boundary changes in 2004, 66 councillors have been elected from 22 wards.

Political control
The borough of Wirral was created under the Local Government Act 1972 as a metropolitan borough, with Merseyside County Council providing county-level services. The first election to the council was held in 1973, initially operating as a shadow authority before coming into its powers on 1 April 1974. Merseyside County Council was abolished in 1986 and Wirral became a unitary authority. Political control of the council since 1973 has been held by the following parties:

Leadership
The leaders of the council since 1973 have been:

Council elections
Since the first election in 1973, boundary changes have occurred in 1980 (where a third of the council were up for election) and in 2004 (where there was an all out election).

1973 Wirral Metropolitan Borough Council election
1975 Wirral Metropolitan Borough Council election
1976 Wirral Metropolitan Borough Council election
1978 Wirral Metropolitan Borough Council election
1979 Wirral Metropolitan Borough Council election
1980 Wirral Metropolitan Borough Council election
1982 Wirral Metropolitan Borough Council election
1983 Wirral Metropolitan Borough Council election
1984 Wirral Metropolitan Borough Council election
1986 Wirral Metropolitan Borough Council election
1987 Wirral Metropolitan Borough Council election
1988 Wirral Metropolitan Borough Council election
1990 Wirral Metropolitan Borough Council election
1991 Wirral Metropolitan Borough Council election
1992 Wirral Metropolitan Borough Council election
1994 Wirral Metropolitan Borough Council election
1995 Wirral Metropolitan Borough Council election
1996 Wirral Metropolitan Borough Council election
1998 Wirral Metropolitan Borough Council election
1999 Wirral Metropolitan Borough Council election
2000 Wirral Metropolitan Borough Council election
2002 Wirral Metropolitan Borough Council election
2003 Wirral Metropolitan Borough Council election
2004 Wirral Metropolitan Borough Council election
2006 Wirral Metropolitan Borough Council election
2007 Wirral Metropolitan Borough Council election
2008 Wirral Metropolitan Borough Council election
2010 Wirral Metropolitan Borough Council election
2011 Wirral Metropolitan Borough Council election
2012 Wirral Metropolitan Borough Council election
2014 Wirral Metropolitan Borough Council election
2015 Wirral Metropolitan Borough Council election
2016 Wirral Metropolitan Borough Council election
2018 Wirral Metropolitan Borough Council election
2019 Wirral Metropolitan Borough Council election
2021 Wirral Metropolitan Borough Council election
2022 Wirral Metropolitan Borough Council election

Borough result maps

Changes between election

1973–1979 boundaries

1979–2004 boundaries

Wallasey by-election 1997

Prenton by-election 2003

2004–present boundaries

Moreton West and Saughall Massie by-election 2009

Leasowe and Moreton East by-election 2013

Heswall by-election 2013

Pensby and Thingwall by-election 2013

Upton by-election 2013

Claughton by-election 2017

Bromborough by-election 2018

Upton by-election 2018

Liscard by-election 2021

Oxton by-election 2021

Liscard by-election 2022

Changes in affiliation

Notes

References

By-election results

External links
Wirral Metropolitan Borough Council

 
Politics of the Metropolitan Borough of Wirral
Local government in the Metropolitan Borough of Wirral
Council elections in Merseyside